Sümeyra Koç (born 27 February 1987) is a Turkish actress.

Early life 
Sümeyra Koç was born into a Bosniak family on 27 February 1987 in Istanbul. Her mother was from the Sandžak region of Serbia and her father was from Montenegro. After finishing her high school, she enrolled in Istanbul Bilgi University School of Public Relations. In her last year in university, she received education at a European university thanks to student exchange programs.

Career 
Upon her return to Turkey, Koç started taking acting lessons at Craft Acting Studios and Sadri Alışık Cultural Cente. 

She made her television debut with the TV series Galip Derviş adaptation of Monk, in which she played the character of Dilek. She had her first cinematic role 2013 with a part in the comedy movie Şevkat Yerimdar. In the same year she was cast in the popular fantasy series Sana Bir Sır Vereceğim as Duru, followed by another role as Havva in historical series Kurt Seyit ve Şura. 

She later appeared as Pervin on the TV program Otel Divane, and portrayed the character of Günce in the TV series Günebakan. In 2015, she played the character of Zeynep in the TV series Kara Kutu, and portrayed another character with the same name in the movie Saruhan. Her main breakthrough came in 2017, with her role as Farah in Fazilet Hanım ve Kızları which made her known in Turkey.

Filmography

References

External links
 

1987 births
Living people
Turkish film actresses
Turkish television actresses
Turkish people of Serbian descent
Turkish people of Montenegrin descent
Turkish people of Bosniak descent
Istanbul Bilgi University alumni
Actresses from Istanbul